Scheufele is a surname. Notable people with the surname include:

 Caroline Scheufele (born 1961), German businesswoman
 Dietram Scheufele, German-American social scientist
 Ernst Scheufele (died 2010), World War II Luftwaffe fighter ace
 Karl-Friedrich Scheufele (born 1958), Swiss businessman